8th ZAI Awards
Grammy Slovakia '97
Presenter(s)  

Broadcaster STV2 

Grand Prix Miroslav Žbirka

◄ 7th │ 9th ►

The 8th ZAI Awards, honoring the best in the Slovak music industry for individual achievements for the year of 1997, took time and place on March 2, 1998, at the New Scene Theater in Bratislava. The ceremony was held in association with the local Music Fund (HF) and was hosted by actress Zdena Studenková. Unlike the previous editions when a clay statuette was designed, the new winners were bestowed a golden, five-pointed star with an inscription that read Grammy Slovakia '97, stationed on a black base.

Winners

Main categories

Others

References

External links
 ZAI Awards > Winners (Official site)
 Grammy Slovakia Awards > 1997 Winners (at SME)

08
Zai Awards
1997 music awards